Jacques Stamm (born 4 April 1939) is a French former footballer. He competed in the men's tournament at the 1960 Summer Olympics.

References

External links
 
 

1939 births
Living people
French footballers
Olympic footballers of France
Footballers at the 1960 Summer Olympics
Sportspeople from Ardennes (department)
Association football forwards
Mediterranean Games gold medalists for France
Mediterranean Games medalists in football
Competitors at the 1967 Mediterranean Games
CS Sedan Ardennes players
Grenoble Foot 38 players
US Quevilly-Rouen Métropole players
Footballers from Grand Est